Metopobactrus is a genus of dwarf spiders that was first described by Eugène Louis Simon in 1884.

Species
 it contains eleven species:
Metopobactrus ascitus (Kulczyński, 1894) – Eastern Europe
Metopobactrus cavernicola Wunderlich, 1992 – Canary Is.
Metopobactrus cornis Seo, 2018 – Korea
Metopobactrus deserticola Loksa, 1981 – Slovakia, Hungary
Metopobactrus falcifrons Simon, 1884 (type) – France, Spain
Metopobactrus nadigi Thaler, 1976 – Switzerland, Austria, Italy
Metopobactrus nodicornis Schenkel, 1927 – Switzerland, Austria
Metopobactrus orbelicus Deltshev, 1985 – Bulgaria
Metopobactrus pacificus Emerton, 1923 – USA
Metopobactrus prominulus (O. Pickard-Cambridge, 1873) – Canada, Europe, Turkey, Caucasus, Russia (Europe to Far East), Japan
Metopobactrus verticalis (Simon, 1881) – France, Corsica, Italy

See also
 List of Linyphiidae species (I–P)

References

Araneomorphae genera
Holarctic spiders
Linyphiidae
Spiders of Europe
Spiders of the United States